The Great Synagogue of Baghdad, also known as the Shaf ve’Yativ Synagogue, is traditionally believed to stand on the site of a synagogue built by King Jeconiah who was exiled from the Land of Israel to Babylon in 597 BCE. It is said that material gathered from the ruins of the Temple in Jerusalem was used in its construction.
The building now serves as a museum in which the synagogue had been rebuilt.

See also
History of the Jews in Iraq

References

Edot HaMizrach
Jews and Judaism in Baghdad
Orthodox synagogues
Synagogues in Iraq
Synagogues preserved as museums
Religious buildings and structures in Baghdad
Sephardi Jewish culture in Asia
Sephardi synagogues
Rebuilt synagogues